Conrad Starkel   (November 16, 1880 – January 19, 1933), was a professional baseball player who played pitcher in the Major Leagues in 1906. He would play in one game for the Washington Senators.

External links

1880 births
1933 deaths
Washington Senators (1901–1960) players
Major League Baseball pitchers
Russian baseball players
Tacoma Tigers players
Olympia Senators players
Boise Fruit Pickers players
Portland Browns players
Indianapolis Indians players
Montgomery Senators players
Albany Senators players
Baltimore Orioles (IL) players
Aberdeen Black Cats players
Aberdeen Grays players
Grays Harbor Grays players
Chehalis Gophers players
Moose Jaw Robin Hoods players
Victoria Bees players
Baker City Golddiggers players
People from Red Oak, Iowa
Major League Baseball players from Russia